WTJF (1390 AM) is a radio station broadcasting a conservative talk format. Licensed to Jackson, Tennessee, United States, the station is owned by Forever Media, through licensee Forever South Licenses, LLC.

History
The station, under the WTJS calls, was the first radio station in Jackson, Tennessee and the entire West Tennessee area excluding Memphis and was the beacon that made Jackson, Tennessee the center hub of what is called the Golden Circle Area. In the 1930s, people listened to WTJS for farm programming, live radio shows and the latest news updates. Being a wide-reaching advertising medium, WTJS enticed listeners from 22 counties to shop in Jackson, thus the genesis of the "Hub City."

On January 16, 2017, WTJS flipped to classic country as Willie 94, in simulcast with 94.3 WDYE. The station changed its call letters to WLLI.

After stunting with Christmas music as Rudolph Radio, on December 30, 2020, WLLI flipped to conservative talk as Tennessee Patriot Network, changing its call letters to WTJF. WTJF also readded the 94.3 simulcast.

As of February 18, 2021, 1390 AM has returned to its previous TJ Network branding, as stated on the clusters website.

References

External links

TJF (AM)
News and talk radio stations in the United States
Jackson, Tennessee
Radio stations established in 1931
1931 establishments in Tennessee
Conservative talk radio